The galant style was an 18th-century movement in music, visual arts and literature. In Germany a closely related style was called the empfindsamer Stil (sensitive style). Another close relative is rococo style. The galant style was drawn in opposition to the strictures of the Baroque style, emphasizing light elegance in place of the Baroque's dignified seriousness and high grandeur.

Music

In music, the galant emphasis was on simplicity, immediacy of appeal, and elegance.

Fashion
In fashion, galant featured perfumed handkerchiefs and powdered wigs for both sexes. The fantastic exotic asymmetry of bizarre silk patterns were symptomatic of galant tastes.

References

External links

18th century in art
18th-century literature
18th century in music